This is a historical timeline of Portugal.

First Republic

1910
October 4 - Beginning of the Republican Revolution. The Republic is proclaimed in Loures, just north of Lisbon.
October 5
The Republican Revolution, supported by popular uprising and virtually no resistance, is victorious and puts an end to the Monarchy.
The last King of Portugal, Manuel II of Portugal, and the Portuguese Royal Family embark in Ericeira for exile in England.
The Republic is officially proclaimed in Lisbon.

1917
Portugal joins the allied forces in World War I.

1921
The Portuguese Communist Party was founded from the ranks of the Portuguese Maximalist Federation as the Portuguese Section of the Communist International.

1925
Bernardino Machado is elected President of the Republic for the 2nd time.

1926
The 28 May 1926 military coup d'état ends the 1st Portuguese Republic.

See also
History of Portugal
Timeline of Portuguese history
Timeline of Portuguese history (Fourth Dynasty)
Timeline of Portuguese history (Second Republic)

First Republic
Republicanism in Portugal
First Portuguese Republic

de:Zeittafel Portugal
nl:Tijdlijn Eerste Portugese republiek
ru:Португалия: Даты Истории